Kristina Marie Shelton (née Sandherr; born June 2, 1980) is an American educator and politician.  A Democrat, she represents the 90th district of the Wisconsin State Assembly, based in Green Bay, Wisconsin.

Early life and career 
Shelton was born in Pittsburgh, Pennsylvania, on June 2, 1980. She attended Pennsylvania State University from 1998 until 2002, graduating with a B.S. in kinesiology, physical and health education. She later attended Marymount University from 2008 until 2010, earning a master's degree in science and health promotion management. She then taught in the Health and Physical Education department at Northern Virginia Community College from 2010 until 2013. Shelton worked for Action for Healthy Kids from 2012 until 2019, when she became a program director at a Green Bay area YWCA.

Political career 
Shelton's political career began as an appointee to the Green Bay Area Public School Board in 2018, chosen by the other members of the board from a list of applicants. She then won a three year term in the 2019 spring election, and currently serves as the board's vice president.

In December 2019, Green Bay's state representative, Staush Gruszynski, was the subject of sexual harassment accusations from an Assembly staffer.  As a result, Gordon Hintz, Democratic leader in the Assembly, stripped Gruszynski of all committee assignments.  Two months later, in February 2020, Shelton announced she would launch a challenge against Gruszynski in the Democratic primary, with the hope of replacing him in the Wisconsin State Assembly.  Shelton defeated Gruszynski in the primary with nearly 80% of the vote, and went on to face Republican Drew Kirsteatter, a 21-year-old airline employee and college student, whom she defeated in the general election.

Personal life 
Shelton is married to Jon Shelton, a professor of history and Democracy & Justice Studies at the University of Wisconsin–Green Bay. They have two children, Sara and Keith. Shelton is a certified yoga instructor.

Electoral history

Green Bay School Board (2019)

| colspan="6" style="text-align:center;background-color: #e9e9e9;"| General Election, April 2, 2019 (choose three)

Wisconsin Assembly (2020, 2022)

| colspan="6" style="text-align:center;background-color: #e9e9e9;"| Democratic Primary, August 11, 2020

| colspan="6" style="text-align:center;background-color: #e9e9e9;"| General Election, November 3, 2020

| colspan="6" style="text-align:center;background-color: #e9e9e9;"| General Election, November 8, 2022

References

External links
 
 
 Campaign website
 Kristina Shelton at Green Bay Area Public School District
 90th Assembly District (2011–2021)

 

Living people
1980 births
Politicians from Green Bay, Wisconsin
Women state legislators in Wisconsin
Democratic Party members of the Wisconsin State Assembly
21st-century American politicians
21st-century American women politicians
Politicians from Pittsburgh
Pennsylvania State University College of Health and Human Development alumni
Marymount University alumni